Harris Whitbeck Pinol (1933 – December 4, 2019) was an upper-class Guatemalan businessman. Whitbeck was a presidential candidate for Guatemala's Partido Patriota or Patriotic Party (PP) during national elections held in 2003. Whitbeck had previously been in the Frente Republicano Guatemalteco or Guatemalan Republican Front (FRG), the political party founded in 1989 by the former Guatemalan strongman and president, former Brigadier General Efraín Ríos Montt, a  Christian evangelist who seized power in a coup toppling then dictator General Romeo Lucas García in 1982. Montt's regime was favored by Ronald Reagan's administration as a staunch U.S. ally and anti-communist bulwark during the turbulent 1980's when civil wars plagued Guatemala, El Salvador and Nicaragua. Prior to breaking away from the FRG, Harris Whitbeck had been one of Rios Montt's closest advisers.

He died on 4 December 2019 at age 86.

References

External links
 https://web.archive.org/web/20071010112042/http://www.denjustpeace.org/Featured%20Articles/GuatemalaElectionsandImpunity.html
 https://query.nytimes.com/gst/fullpage.html?res=9C0CE1DF133CF932A25753C1A966958260
 https://query.nytimes.com/gst/fullpage.html?res=9C0CEEDD1339F93AA35753C1A966958260&sec=&spon=&pagewanted=all
 http://gsn.civiblog.org/blog/Video/offset=35
 http://www.preventgenocide.org/americas/guatemala/
 https://web.archive.org/web/20071007074132/http://www.wilsoncenter.org/topics/pubs/ACF18E5.pdf
 http://www.jackhicks.com/e107_files/downloads/Indigenousthesesanddissertations.pdf
 http://www.envio.org.ni/articulo/1798
 http://www.envio.org.ni/articulo/2146
 http://www.giga-hamburg.de/dl/download.php?d=/content/publikationen/pdf/wp19_oettler.pdf
 http://www1.umn.edu/humanrts/cases/21-94-GUATEMALA.htm
 https://web.archive.org/web/20060922040733/http://www.zmag.org/content/showarticle.cfm?ItemID=3261
 http://farmertofarmer.org/Winter04newsletter.pdf
 http://www1.umn.edu/humanrts/commission/country52/15-gtm.htm
 https://query.nytimes.com/gst/fullpage.html?res=9C0CEFD91739F932A15753C1A966958260

Living people
Guatemalan businesspeople
Institutional Republican Party politicians
Patriotic Party (Guatemala) politicians
1933 births